or  is the supernatural undersea palace of Ryūjin or Dragon God in Japanese tradition.

It is best known as the place in fairytale where Urashima Tarō was invited after saving a turtle, where he was entertained by the Dragon God's princess Oto-hime and his minions, but when Urashima returned back to land after what he thought was a few days away, centuries had passed.

Overview 
Ryūgū or Ryūgū-jō is the fabulous mythical residence of the Ryūjin (Dragon God) or Sea God, or the princess Otohime. It is also equated with the "fish-scale palace" (iroko no goto tsukureru miya)" which was the Sea God Watatsumi's palace mentioned in the Kojiki (8th century).

The Ryūgū is well-known as the supernatural place in the fisherman's fairytale Urashima Tarō, and most Japanese now consider it to be a place which supposed to lie under the sea. Actually, Ryūgū that appears in other narratives and fairytales (otogi banashi) had been considered to be underwater for a long time, but in the particular case of the Urashima legend, its Dragon Palace was not firmly considered to be underwater until quite late in the modern period.

Urashima

Afloat or undersea 
In most familiar versions of the Urashima legend nowadays in Japan, the Ryūgū lies undersea, but in early and otogizoshi versions, the fisherman traveled to Hōrai (Mount Penglai, the Elysium in Chinese tradition), a floating island. During the Edo era, pictorial depiction of Ryūgū above the waves remained fairly conventional. A work may be illustrate a Ryūgū above water, yet describe it textually as underwater, as in a burlesque gesaku work of 1782.

In the Meiji era,  or "redbook picture books" of the 1880s, as well as Tsukioka Yoshitoshi's (1886) print are examples of Ryūgū illustrated above water, but they are lacking in textual detail on whether it is a sunken city or not. The akahon illustrations were appropriated by Masayuki Kataoka's English translation (1886), which describes the Dragon Palace as visible  "far below" the water, to which the man carried by the reptile "descended".

Ryūgū was described as a "Dragon Palace beyond the blue sea", in Basil Hall Chamberlain's translation (1886). Here the "Dragon Palace" is illustrated as a complex of buildings atop an island, with fishes clad in kimono walking about the sandy shore. Chamberlain had freely substituted more ancient text material into his retelling of the Urashima fairytale. Chamberlain also interchangeably uses "Sea God's Palace", probably with the archaic god-name Watatsumi in mind.

Eventually, the Dragon Palace undersea became the standard in modern tellings of the Urashima tale. An canonical example by the Taisho Era, according to one researcher, was the edition by Mori Rintarō (novelist Mori Ōgai) and others, published 1920–1921, whose illustration shows Urashima and the turtle peeing underneath at the palace.

Palace architecture 
"The walls of the Palace were of coral, the trees had emeralds for leaves and rubies for berries" (Chamberlain), roughly coincides with the inner chambers being fashioned with  according to Meiji Era akahon ehon ("red book" editions).

The use of materials such as pearl or crystal on the exterior is given in Brauns' translation (Englished by Lang), alongside the interior hall being illuminated by fish scales.

Masayuki Kataoka's English translation (1886) describes a Dragon's Palace with a crystal dome, which a researcher considers a novel, unfamiliar feature. Kataoka's translation, upon comparison, differed greatly from the text of the akahon picture books, though he had blatantly appropriated and reworked their illustrations. Here, there is a long distance from the gatekeeper to the palace proper, and Urashima is guided by a pretty glass ball that rolls of is own accord.

Four seasons on four sides 
A notable feature of the Dragon Palace according to the "feudal" (otogizōshi) versions is the view to the "four seasons on four sides", though this has been eschewed in Chamberlain's translation.
 
However, the view to the four seasons is incorporated in Mrs. Ozaki's translation: cherry blossom in bloom to the east (spring), buzzing cicadas to the south (summer), multi-colored maple leaves to the west (autumn), and snow-covered ground to the north (winter). The four seasons also figure in F. Hadland Davis's synopsis (1912). The usual bird which sings in spring is the bush warbler, not actually a nightingale. More precise translations from the otogizōshi text are given elsewhere.

Passage of time 

Whether in the ancient (Nara Period), feudal period or standard modern versions of Urashima, he believes he has spent 3 years at the otherworld or Dragon Palace, but more than 300 years had elapsed in the ancient and standard modern versions (700 years in the feudal period versions). The Mizukagami (1195) gives a more precise reckoning; Urashima supposedly returned in the 2nd year of Tenchō (825 AD), 347 years later. This matches the claim in Nihon shoki that he disappeared in the year of Yuraku 22, conventionally assigned the year 478. But it also means he did not come back until a century after the Nihon shoki was written.

Hoderi and Hoori 

In the mythology concerning the two princes Hoderi ("Fire Flash") and Hoori ("Fire Fade") in the Kojiki, the latter younger brother adventures to the Sea God's palace and emerges triumphant, and sires the line of emperors. The story has been often retold as fairytale, e.g. as "The Princes Fire-flash & Fire-fade".

The Sea-God's palace, a "palace built like fishes' scales", is interpreted to be a metaphor for a silver-colored structure.

Local lore 

In the Ryukyuan religion, Ryūgū-jō (Okinawan: Ruuguu) is the source of fire for all family and village hearths.

Ryūgū-no-tsukai and Jinjahime 

"messenger/servant of Ryūgū" or "Messenger from the Sea God's Palace".

This real species of fish may have been the origins of the mythical , which also claimed to be a "messenger/servant of Ryūgū". This , was a type of the so-called "prophet beast" (yogenjū) during the Edo period, which prophesied bountiful harvest followed by epidemic.

Monuments 

The Katase-Enoshima Station in Fujisawa, Kanagawa Prefecture is a structure built to resemble Ryūgū-jō, as a mock-up.

Ryūgū Shrine derives its name from Ryūgū-jō. Located on Cape Nagasakibana (also known as Cape Ryūgū) in southern Kagoshima, it is said to be where Urashima Tarō traveled to Ryūgū-jō. Locals honor Ryūjin and turtles as protectors.

See also
The Sea King and Vasilisa the Wise
Eglė the Queen of Serpents
162173 Ryugu, an asteroid named after Ryūgū-jō

Explanatory notes

References

Bibliography

 
 ; alt copy @ Library of Congress
 
 
 
 
 
 
  Project Gutenberg text
 
 
 

 
 

Locations in Japanese mythology